Lewis Morgan Hayward (28 August 1890 – 21 October 1971) was a New Zealand fish curer, and professional rugby league footballer who played in the 1910s. He played at representative level for New Zealand (Heritage № 76), and Thames, as a forward (prior to the specialist positions of), during the era of contested scrums.

Hayward was the brother of fellow New Zealand international, Harold Hayward.

International honours
Hayward represented New Zealand in 1912 against New South Wales on New Zealand's tour of Australia. He played for Thames while it was a sub-league of the Auckland Rugby League.

References

1890 births
1971 deaths
New Zealand national rugby league team players
New Zealand rugby league players
Place of birth missing
Place of death missing
Rugby league forwards
Thames rugby league team players